Bill Clegg is an American literary agent and author. Clegg's first two memoirs detail his addiction to crack cocaine. His debut novel, Did You Ever Have a Family, received offers from four publishers and was longlisted for the 2015 Man Booker Prize.

Biography
William Robert “Bill” Clegg grew up in Sharon, Connecticut. His father William Clegg Jr. was a pilot with TWA. His mother is Kathy Jeanne née Ruscoe. He has two sisters and a brother.

Clegg is a graduate of Washington College.

He is openly gay and was in a long-term relationship with filmmaker Ira Sachs. Sachs based his film Keep the Lights On (2012) on their relationship.

In 2013, he married Van Scott Jr., a communications manager at CNN.

Career
Upon the urging of a girlfriend, Clegg took a Radcliffe Publishing Course in 1993. This led to an entry-level position at the Robbins Office.

In March 2001, he and Sarah Burnes cofounded the literary agency Clegg and Burnes. The firm's roster of clients included: Nicole Krauss, Susan Choi,  Anne Carson, Heather Clay, Nick Flynn, Salvatore Scibona, Akhil Sharma, Heather McGowen, David Gilbert, Stephen Elliott, and Andrew Sean Greer.

Clegg and Burnes abruptly closed under mysterious circumstances. It was later revealed that a contributing factor to the firm’s closure was Clegg disappearing on a drug binge.

After getting sober, Clegg returned to publishing and is currently an agent with William Morris Endeavor. Many of his former clients returned to him. While at WME, Clegg began writing his memoirs.

Bibliography
Portrait of an Addict as a Young Man: a memoir (2010)
Ninety Days: a memoir (2012)
Did You Ever Have a Family: a novel (2015)
The End of the Day: a novel (2020)

Awards

Did You Ever Have a Family was longlisted by both the National Book Awards and the Man Booker Prize.

References

21st-century American novelists
21st-century American male writers
American book publishers (people)
Cocaine in the United States
American gay writers
Literary agents
Living people
Novelists from Connecticut
Writers from Connecticut
Writers on addiction
Year of birth missing (living people)
21st-century American LGBT people
21st-century American non-fiction writers
American male non-fiction writers
American male novelists
American LGBT novelists